Jim Poolman (born May 15, 1970, Fargo, North Dakota) is a banker and politician from the U.S. state of North Dakota.  He served as Insurance Commissioner of North Dakota from 2001 until his resignation on August 31, 2007.

Biography
Poolman was raised in Fargo, North Dakota and graduated from Fargo South High School in 1988. In 1992, he graduated from the University of North Dakota in Grand Forks with a Bachelor's Degree in Business Administration. Poolman then went on to be elected to the North Dakota House of Representatives as a Republican later in 1992, serving District 42. Poolman was elected as North Dakota Insurance Commissioner in 2000, and took office in 2001. He was re-elected in 2004, when he received 64% of the vote against challenger Terry Barnes. He is married to Nicole, who is a teacher and State Senator, and has three children; Collin, Grace, and Nicholas.

Career
North Dakota House of Representatives (1992—2000)
North Dakota Insurance Commissioner (2001—2007)

References

|-

|-

Living people
Politicians from Fargo, North Dakota
University of North Dakota alumni
1970 births
Insurance Commissioners of North Dakota
Members of the North Dakota House of Representatives
State insurance commissioners of the United States